The 2011–12 Biathlon World Cup was a multi-race tournament over a season of biathlon, organised by the International Biathlon Union. The season started on 30 November 2011 in Östersund, Sweden and ended on 18 March 2012 in Khanty-Mansiysk, Russia.

Calendar
Below is the IBU World Cup calendar for the 2011–12 season.

World Cup podiums

Men

Women

Men's team

Women's team

Mixed Relay

Standings: Men

Overall 

Final standings after 26 races.

Individual 

Final standings after 3 races.

Sprint 

Final standings after 10 races.

Pursuit 

Final standings after 8 races.

Mass start 

Final standings after 5 races.

Relay 

Final standings after 4 races.

Nation 

Final standings after 20 races.

Standings: Women

Overall 

Final standings after 26 races.

Individual 

Final standings after 3 races.

Sprint 

Final standings after 10 races.

Pursuit 

Final standings after 8 races.

Mass start 

Final standings after 5 races.

Relay 

Final standings after 4 races.

Nation 

Final standings after 20 races.

Standings: Mixed

Mixed Relay 

Final standings after 3 races.

Medal table

Achievements
First World Cup career victory
 , 29, in his 8th season — the WC 5 Individual in Nové Město; first podium was 2006-07 Sprint in Khanty-Mansiysk
 , 22, in his 4th season — the WC 6 Sprint in Antholz; it also was his first podium
, 23, in his 2nd season — the WC 7 Sprint in Holmenkollen; first podium was 2011-12 Sprint in Antholz
, 24, in his 6th season — the World Championships Individual in Ruhpolding; first podium was 2008-09 Individual in Pyeong Chang

First World Cup podium
, 28, in her 10th season — no. 2 in the WC 1 Individual in Östersund
, 29, in his 9th season — no. 3 in the WC 1 Pursuit in Östersund
, 23, in his 1st season — no. 3 in the WC 3 Sprint in Hochfilzen (2)
, 23, in his 2nd season — no. 2 in the WC 6 Sprint in Antholz
, 24, in his 1st season — no. 3 in the WC 8 Pursuit in Kontiolahti
, 23, in her 3rd season — no. 3 in the World Championships Pursuit in Ruhpolding

Victory in this World Cup (all-time number of victories in parentheses)

Men
 , 8 (14) first places
 , 4 (28) first places
 , 3 (4) first places
 , 2 (6) first places
 , 2 (3) first places
 , 1 (93) first place
 , 1 (6) first place
 , 1 (2) first place
 , 1 (1) first place
 , 1 (1) first place
 , 1 (1) first place
 , 1 (1) first place

Women
 , 10 (34) first places
 , 6 (9) first places
 , 4 (16) first places
 , 3 (12) first places
 , 2 (5) first places
 , 1 (21) first place

Retirements
Following are notable biathletes who announced their retirement:
 
 
 
 
 
 
 
 
 
 
 
 
 
  (comeback in 2016–17 season)

References

External links
IBU official site

 
Biathlon World Cup
World Cup
World Cup